Vesperus is a genus of beetles in the family Vesperidae.

Species
 Vesperus aragonicus Baraud, 1964 
 Vesperus barredai Verdugo, 2009 
 Vesperus bolivari Oliveira, 1893 
 Vesperus brevicollis Graells, 1858 
 Vesperus conicicollis Faimaire & Coquerel, 1866 
 Vesperus creticus Ganglbauer, 1886 
 Vesperus flaveolus Mulsant & Rey, 1863 
 Vesperus fuentei Pic, 1905 
 Vesperus gomezi Verdugo, 2004 
 Vesperus jertensis Bercedo & Bahillo, 1999 
 Vesperus joanivivesi Vives, 1998 
 Vesperus ligusticus Vitali, 2001 
 Vesperus luridus (Rossi, 1794) 
 Vesperus macropterus Sama, 1999 
 Vesperus nigellus Compte, 1963 
 Vesperus ocularis Mulsant & Rey, 1863 
 Vesperus sanzi Reitter, 1895 
 Vesperus serranoi Zuzarte, 1985 
 Vesperus strepens (Fabricius, 1793) 
 Vesperus xatarti Dufour, 1839

References
Biolib
Worldwide Cerambycoidea Photo Gallery

Vesperidae
Taxa named by Pierre François Marie Auguste Dejean
Chrysomeloidea genera